The Ace of Spades is a 1935 British drama film directed by George Pearson and starring Michael Hogan, Dorothy Boyd and Richard Cooper.

Cast
 Michael Hogan - Nick Trent 
 Dorothy Boyd - Nita Daventry 
 Richard Cooper - Tony Cosgrave 
 Michael Shepley - George Despard 
 Jane Carr - Cleo Despard 
 Geraldine Fitzgerald - Evelyn Daventry 
 Sebastian Shaw - Trent 
 Felix Aylmer - Lord Yardleigh 
 Bobbie Comber - Andrews

References

External links

1935 films
British drama films
1935 drama films
1930s English-language films
Films shot at Twickenham Film Studios
Films directed by George Pearson
British black-and-white films
1930s British films